During the 2008–09 season, Partick Thistle participate in the Scottish First Division

Team kit
The team kit for the 2008–09 season is produced by Puma in partnership with Greaves Sports and the main shirt sponsor is Ignis asset management. The away kit is pink with grey stripes, and has attracted much media attention at the start of the season.

Current squad

Youth squad

Match results

Friendlies

League

Scottish Cup

League Cup

Challenge Cup

Player statistics

First Division

Scottish Cup

League Cup

Challenge Cup

Friendlies

Goalscorers

League table

References 

Partick Thistle F.C. seasons
Partick Thistle